ASGE is a four-letter initialism with multiple meanings:
 American Society for Gastrointestinal Endoscopy
 American Society of Gas Engineers
 Associate of Science in General Education
 Association for the Study of the Grants Economy
 Academic Sites for Geomatics Engineering
 Advancement of Simulation and Gaming in Education